Millennium is the sixteenth studio album by American band Earth, Wind & Fire released in September 1993 on Warner Bros. Records. The album reached No. 8 on the US Billboard Top R&B Albums chart, No. 39 on the US Billboard 200, No. 18 on the Japanese Pop Albums chart and No. 29 on the Dutch Album Top 100. Millennium has also been certified Gold in Japan by the RIAJ.

Overview
Millennium marked the band's return after 21 years to Warner Bros. Records. The album was also produced by EWF's founder and leader Maurice White.

Artists such as Prince and Ronnie Laws appeared on the LP.

Critical reception

Tom Sinclair of Vibe proclaimed that EWF "demonstrate they still have the knack for constructing mellifluous R&B on the visonary/romantic tip." With a 4 out of 5 stars rating the Buffalo News commented "EW&F, one of the few groups that kept black popular music alive when disco ruled, has poured new life into a proven musical formula. Its latest project contains a plethora of kalimbas, blaring horns, and converging Afro-Cuban and Latin rhythms. Add the stratospheric voices of EW&F founder Maurice White, and star-lead vocalist Philip Bailey, and behold: a revamped re-creation of the message-laden, massaging tunes the band was known for in its heyday."
Paul Willistein of The Morning Call wrote "There are more than half a dozen standouts among the disc's 16 tracks, making this a must have for longtime fans."
Renee Graham of The Boston Globe noted that Millennium "returns the band to its funk/r&b roots" with a "tasty bit of Minneapolis funk".  With a three out of four star rating James T. Jones IV of USA Today found that the band "returned to their trademark sound: snappy horns, kalimba (thumb piano), falsetto harmonies, Afro-Cuban influences, instrumental interludes and philosophical lyrics." Derek Ali of the Dayton Daily News gave a 3.5 out of 5 stars rating saying "With its Millennium album, Earth, Wind & Fire proves its one of those rare groups that can maintain a musical style for several decades while keeping pace with today's sounds". Gary Graff of the Detroit Free Press wrote "EWF returns to the joyous R&B that made it famous, landing smooth if not exactly landmark results."  Andy Gill of The Independent stated "if it's an old-style R&B sensibility you're after, the new Earth, Wind & Fire album may be just the ticket."

The Buffalo News placed the album on its list of the best R&B/Hip-Hop albums of 1993. 
Millennium was also nominated for a Soul Train Music Award within the category of Best R&B/Soul Album - Group, Band or Duo.

Singles
The track "Sunday Morning", earned a Grammy nomination for Best R&B Vocal Performance by a Duo or Group. Released as a single, it peaked at No. 10 on the Billboard Adult R&B Songs chart, No. 20 on the Hot R&B Singles chart and No. 35 on the Adult Contemporary chart.

The album cut "Spend the Night" reached Nos. 36 and 42 on the Billboard Adult R&B Songs and Hot R&B/Hip-Hop Songs charts, respectively.

Covers
The Prince-penned track, "Super Hero", was covered by the New Power Generation featuring the Steeles for the soundtrack to the film Blankman.

Track listing

Charts

Certifications

References

1993 albums
New jack swing albums
Earth, Wind & Fire albums
Albums produced by Maurice White
Warner Records albums